Vasileios Melas (1879 in Athens – 1956) was an Lieutenant General of the Hellenic army. He was Pavlos Melas' younger brother.

Biography
Vasileios Melas was born in Athens and was the last of the seven children of the jurist, merchant and politician Michail Melas and Eleni G. Voutsina from Kefalonia. When he finished secondary school, Vassileios studied in the Hellenic Military Academy. At the age of 17, he discontinued his studies, joined the cavalry as a corporal and took part in the Greco-Turkish War of 1897. By the end of the war, he continued his studies and graduated from the academy with the rank of second lieutenant.

Later he continued his military studies at the Infantry and Cavalry School in Namur in Belgium and then he studied as lieutenant in the Cavalry School at Saumur (France) (1910–11). He fought in the Balkan Wars of 1912–13 and in the Northern Epirote autonomy struggle in 1914. In 1915–16, Melas studied at the Captains School. He took part in the Greco-Turkish War of 1919–22 as Commander of the Cavalry Division (1920). As colonel, he also served as adjutant of King Alexander of Greece.

From 1923 until 1925, Melas served as military attaché of Greece in Belgrade and later in Paris and London. In 1926 Melas was promoted to the rank of major general and in 1930 he became a lieutenant general.

Although, at his request, he retired in 1936. However, he took part in the Greco-Italian War, when he was appointed as senior military commander of Argyrokastro. At the end of the war, he retired. For this period of his life, he wrote the “Αναμνήσεις και εντυπώσεις αντιστρατήγου Βασ. Μιχ. Μελά από την διοίκησίν του εν Αργυροκάστρω κατά τον Ιταλικόν πόλεμον 1940-1941” (“Memories and impressions of the Lieutenant General Vas. M. Melas from his command in Argyrokastro during Italian War 1940-1941”). During his military career he was injured 3 times. Melas was honored many times for his heroism.

He participated in many associations and unions. He was also president of the Athenian Club (1938–41 and 1949–56), the Management Committee of Vasileios G. Melas, the Philippos Union and the Epirote Society of Athens, of which he was founding member. Melas was also collaborator in writing the Great Greek Encyclopedia.

After his retirement, he participated in many public welfare activities. Vasileios Melas was a mason in Skenderbeis lodge of Athens, while during the Axis occupation of Greece he was imprisoned by the German forces.

He died in 1956 in Athens. His personal archive has been deposited in the National Historical Museum of Greece. He married Eleni Soutsou, daughter of Alexandros Soutsos (General and President of the Athenian Club) and Sophia Nikolaou Mavrokordatou.

References

Bibliography
Pavlos Drandakis, «Μεγάλη Ελληνική Εγκυκλοπαίδεια», vol. ΙΣΤ'.
Olga Palaiologou, Το Νηπιακόν Επιμελητήριον Μελά/ Η ίδρυση και τα πρώτα χρόνια (1893-1922), Society for Epirotic Studies, Ioannina 2011.
Maria Papanastasiou, Αρχείο Βασιλείου Μιχαήλ Μελά, από το επιστημονικό περιοδικό Τεκμήρια Ιστορίας/Μονογραφίες, Historical and Ethnological Society of Greece, Athens 2009.

1870s births
1956 deaths
20th-century Greek people
Hellenic Army lieutenant generals
Greek military personnel of the Greco-Turkish War (1897)
Greek military personnel of the Greco-Turkish War (1919–1922)
Greek military personnel of the Balkan Wars
Greek military personnel of World War II
Greek Freemasons
Military personnel from Athens